Dario Quenstedt (born 22 September 1989) is a German handball player who plays for TSV Hannover-Burgdorf and the German national team.

References

External links 

 EHF profile

1989 births
Living people
German male handball players
Handball-Bundesliga players
People from Burg bei Magdeburg
Sportspeople from Saxony-Anhalt
SC Magdeburg players
THW Kiel players